The South Florida Bulls beach volleyball team will represent the University of South Florida in the sport of women's beach volleyball at the NCAA National Collegiate level beginning in spring 2025. It will be one of two sports team at USF making its debut in spring 2025, as the school will start a women's lacrosse team the same semester.

Their future conference affiliation is to be announced, as the Bulls main conference, the American Athletic Conference, does not sponsor the sport of beach volleyball. The Bulls will play their home games on campus, with a new three court facility set to be built on the north side of the Yuengling Center before their first season.

History 
The team was first announced in February 2022 and will become the university's 21st varsity sports team (and 12th women's team) when they begin play in spring 2025. At the time of the team's founding, beach volleyball was the newest NCAA sport and was sponsored by 86 teams across the NCAA's three divisions. NCAA beach volleyball championships are competed at the National Collegiate level rather than division levels like most NCAA sports, meaning that Division I, II, and III schools all compete directly against each other.

See also 
 South Florida Bulls
 South Florida Bulls volleyball

Notes

References

External links 
 Team website

South Florida Bulls